Paul Williams  is an English composer and pianist.

Biography

Paul Williams (aka Terry Day) studied at the Royal College of Music before going on to read Music at Cambridge University, where he gained an M.A. While still at Jesus College, he teamed up with Roger Wornell, and under the pen names of Paul de Schroder  and Lee Lenrow, they found a local rock and roll group called "The Phantoms", write songs for them, and arranged to be "discovered" by Pallette records. Their first record, "Phantom Guitar" and "Cachina" is now recognised as a classic of its genre. He has been composing since the age of eight and plays a variety of keyboard instruments. Williams has also worked as a session musician with numerous bands and orchestras, and has more recently worked with Phil Manzanera of Roxy Music fame.

Williams also composes for major international publishing companies, including Carlin Music, Sound Stage, Parry Music and Zomba Production Music with over 1300 titles published. His compositions range from the horrifying, through the romantic, into high-tech. Paul has also worked at BBC Radios 1 & 2 with many major production credits.

Currently living in Cheam, Surrey, near London, Williams spends the majority of his time composing and recording.

Major credits (film and television)

 "Crocodile" Dundee (1986) - love theme
 Neighbours (Grundy TV Australia) - incidental music underscores
 Father Christmas Letters - film score
 Everybody Wins (Karel Reisz) - incidental music
 A Country Practice (Australian TV) - incidental music
 House of Gristle (BBC 1 TV Series) - theme and incidental music
 Out of this World (BBC 1 TV Documentary) - theme & incidental music
 Natural Neighbours (BBC 1 TV) - incidental music
 My Good friend (Hartswood films) - incidental music
 ‘Mysteries’ with Carol Vorderman BBC TV 1997 & 1998 - main theme & incidental music
 Growing Places Series (BBC TV, 1998 — 26 parts) - main Theme & incidental music
 Deep Impact (1998) - incidental music
 Butterfly Legend 1999, Hollywood - songs & incidental music

Major credits (commercials)

 Flash Cascade
 Heineken
 Hewlett-Packard
 ICI
 National Panasonic
 Sony
 Suchard
 Tetley Tea
 TSB
 Uncle Ben's Rice
 Brittany Ferries
 Lunn Poly
 SonyEricsson

References

External links
 Personal Website
 

Living people
English composers
Alumni of the Royal College of Music
Alumni of Jesus College, Cambridge
Year of birth missing (living people)